The Philippines hosted the 11th Southeast Asian Games for the first time and held from 6 to 15 December 1981 in the city of Manila.

SEA Games performance
The Philippine contingent, from the 24 golds which they won in the 1979 games in Jakarta, came through this time with 55 golds and a third place overall finish. Gintong Alay Project Director and Philippine Olympic Committee chairman Michael Keon was jubilant over the Philippines' impressive show of strength but told the delegations gathered during the closing rites that it was never the design of the host country to dominate the 11th SEA games.

The Philippines came through with a bumper harvest of golds in cycling, winning eight of the golds disputed. The host country also grabbed eight golds in athletics -track and field and bowling.  Boxing and weightlifting had six golds each. Swimming produced four gold medals, with three credited to Billy Wilson, who came home from his studies and training in the US, and one to veteran Jairulla Jaitulla.

Lydia de Vega and Isidro del Prado were the country's two double gold medal winners and were cited with more honors. De Vega was cited as best female track performer for her record-breaking performances in the 200 meters and del Prado as the best male track performer for a record-breaking performances in the 400 meters.

It was World Champion Bong Coo of bowling, who emerged as the Philippines' most bemedalled campaigner winning four gold medals and two silver medals in six events disputed. The Filipinos were blanked in three events; archery, badminton and table tennis.

Medalists

Gold

Silver

Bronze

Multiple

Medal summary

By sports

References

Southeast Asian Games
Nations at the 1981 Southeast Asian Games
1981